The  or Chita Line is a Japanese railway line connecting Taketoyo with Minamichita within Aichi Prefecture. It is owned and operated by the private railway operator Nagoya Railroad (Meitetsu). The line features seven tunnels and a maximum grade of 3.4% (approximately 1 in 29).

Stations

History
The Fuki to Kaminoma section opened in 1974, and the line was extended to Chita-Okuda the following year, Noma in 1976, and Utsumi in 1980. Currently single track, the formation and tunnels are built to accommodate future double-tracking of the line.

References
This article incorporates material from the corresponding article in the Japanese Wikipedia.

Rail transport in Aichi Prefecture
Chita New Line
Railway lines opened in 1980
1067 mm gauge railways in Japan